Hotel Kernan, also known as the Congress Hotel, is a historic hotel located at Baltimore, Maryland, United States. It is a six-story plus mansard roof, French Renaissance Revival-style structure detailed in brick and terra cotta.  It is constructed of steel and reinforced concrete and is "U"-shaped in plan.  It was designed in 1903 by Philadelphia architect John Allen for theatrical impresario James Lawrence Kernan (1838-1912), who lived at the hotel until his death in 1912.

Hotel Kernan was listed on the National Register of Historic Places in 1999.

References

External links

, including photo in 1999, at Maryland Historical Trust

Congress Hotel – Explore Baltimore Heritage

Downtown Baltimore
Hotels in Maryland
Hotel buildings on the National Register of Historic Places in Baltimore
Hotel buildings completed in 1903
Renaissance Revival architecture in Maryland
Historic American Buildings Survey in Baltimore